The Rizal Memorial Sports Complex (RMSC; formerly known as Rizal Memorial Field) is a national sports complex of the Philippines, located on Pablo Ocampo St. (formerly Vito Cruz St.), Malate, Manila. It is named in honor of the country's national hero, José Rizal (1861–1896). The complex is currently managed by the Philippine Sports Commission, while the property is owned by the Manila City government. The complex also houses the administrative office of the PSC, and quarters for the Philippine national athletes.

History
Standing on the site of the former Manila Carnival Grounds, the Rizal Memorial Sports Complex (then known as Rizal Memorial Field) was constructed in 1927 and was inaugurated in time for the 1934 Far Eastern Championship Games. The land was donated by the Vito Cruz family and the initial sports facilities  - the track and football stadium, the baseball stadium, the tennis stadium (later renovated into an indoor arena) and the swimming stadium - were designed by architect Juan Arellano in the Art Deco style. It was planned and built by then-Public Works secretary, Antonio de las Alas. Construction for a multi-purpose arena was begun in the 1960s.

During the Philippine Commonwealth era, the sports complex was used as a civic area and was the site where Manuel Quezon was named one of the presidential candidates in the  1935 elections. It was destroyed during the Battle of Manila of World War II, and reconstructed in 1953 (although the baseball stadium reopened in January 1946 after the floodlights was repaired.) for use in the 1954 Asian Games.

Baseball legends Lou Gehrig and Babe Ruth once hit their first and second home runs ever, respectively, in the exhibition game held at the newly built Rizal Memorial Baseball Stadium on December 2, 1934.

The Beatles held their infamous, two sold-out concerts in the Philippines on July 4, 1966, at the Rizal Memorial Stadium. The combined attendance was 80,000, with the evening concert registering 50,000 paying audience and became the Beatles' second largest concert ever.

On November 22, 2016, then-Manila Mayor Joseph Estrada announced that the city government is making a partnership with businessman Enrique Razon to convert the Rizal Memorial Sports Complex into a commercial center which will include a mall and cinemas. The group of Razon had expressed interest for the proposed urban redevelopment and modernization of the RMSC. The plan was to build-up contemporary buildings and commercial structures with modern smart technologies and amenities, as well as more greener open spaces within the property. A sports museum would also be construct here, while the facade of the Rizal Memorial Coliseum would be retained. The PSC had reportedly planned to be transferred the facilities in the proposed Philippine Sports City (now named New Clark City Sports Hub) located in New Clark City, Capas, Tarlac. The move was criticized by various heritage groups and athletes, even including de las Alas' surviving daughters with an online petition posted on Change.org was initiated to save the Rizal Memorial Sports Complex amid several reports on the planned redevelopment. Estrada defended the redevelopment of the RMSC, said that no one uses the complex anymore and it became old, and antiquated.

In April 2017, the sports complex was declared as a National Historical Landmark by the National Historical Commission of the Philippines and an Important Cultural Property by the National Museum of the Philippines ensuring the site's preservation due to the National Cultural Heritage Act.

Because of the declaration, the Razon group later dropped its bid to redevelop the complex and the Philippine Sports Commission halted its negotiations with the Manila City government on the planned sale of RMSC, instead it will be focused on rehabilitating the sports complex. On August 7, 2019, both the PSC and the Manila City government (under the succeeding administration of Mayor Isko Moreno) agreed to not selling the complex.

On June 27, 2019, PSC announced that the complex will be undergo renovation for the 2019 Southeast Asian Games, after PAGCOR donated  pesos to the PSC for the renovation of the complex in April 2019. Renovation work began on July 8, 2019 Unlike the previous renovations which were minor, the complex will have its major makeover for the first time since the rebuilding of the complex in 1953, with the coliseum restoring to its original look, and the addition of new installments to fit with international standards. The renovation of the facilities inside the complex will not only used for the SEA Games, it will also used to host both future local and international tournaments from various sports and it can become home again of the UAAP, NCAA, and the PBA. Proceeds from rentals would be used by the PSC to address the needs of the Filipino athletes.

The complex was converted to a quarantine facility during the coronavirus pandemic. It housed patients from the Philippine General Hospital who have mild symptoms.

In August 2021, the PSC renamed facilities within the Rizal Memorial Sports Complex after reputed Filipino athletes.

Notable events

Far Eastern Championship Games (1913, 1919, 1925, 1934)
1954 Asian Games
Southeast Asian Games (1981, 1991, 2005, 2019)
2005 ASEAN Para Games
2006 Asian Women's Club Volleyball Championship

Facilities

Sports venues

Other

See also
New Clark City Sports Hub
PhilSports Complex

References

External links

Philippine Sports Commission
Map of the RMSC

Venues of the 2005 Southeast Asian Games
Sports venues in Manila
Buildings and structures in Malate, Manila
Sports in Manila
Tourist attractions in Manila
Art Deco architecture in the Philippines
Taekwondo venues
National Historical Landmarks of the Philippines
Sports complexes in the Philippines